William Bret Baier (born August 4, 1970) is the host of Special Report with Bret Baier on the Fox News Channel and the chief political correspondent for Fox. He previously worked as the network's Chief White House Correspondent and Pentagon correspondent.

Early life
Baier was born in Rumson, New Jersey, to a family of mixed German and Irish origins. Raised Catholic, he attended Marist School, a private Roman Catholic high school in Atlanta, Georgia, graduating in 1988. Baier then attended the methodist DePauw University in Greencastle, Indiana, graduating in 1992 with a BA degree in political science and English. At DePauw, he became a member of the Xi Chapter of the Sigma Chi fraternity.

Career

Baier began his television career with a local station WJWJ TV16 on Hilton Head Island, South Carolina, before joining WRAL-TV, then CBS affiliate in Raleigh, North Carolina. He sent an audition tape to Fox News in 1998, and was hired as the network's Atlanta bureau chief. On September 11, 2001, he drove from Georgia to Arlington, Virginia, to cover the attack on the Pentagon. He never returned to the Atlanta bureau and was instead tapped as the network's Pentagon correspondent, remaining at the post for five years and taking 11 trips to Afghanistan and 13 trips to Iraq.

He was named Fox News's White House correspondent in 2007, covering the administration of George W. Bush. In the fall of 2007, he began substituting for Brit Hume, then the anchor of Special Report, on Fridays.

On December 23, 2008, Hume anchored his final show and announced Baier would replace him as anchor of Special Report. He hosted his first show as permanent anchor on January 5, 2009.

In October 2021, Baier promoted his new book To Rescue the Republic: Ulysses S. Grant, the Fragile Union, and the Crisis of 1876 on The Late Show with Stephen Colbert.

Recognition
2016 Kenneth Y. Tomlinson Award for Outstanding Journalism, Robert Novak Journalism Fellowship Program 
2017 Sol Taishoff Award for Excellence in Broadcast Journalism, National Press Foundation
2018 Urbino Press Award, Municipality of Urbino

Personal life
Baier, who served as an altar boy in his youth, is a practicing Roman Catholic and attends Holy Trinity Catholic Church in Georgetown.

Baier and his wife Amy have two sons, Daniel and Paul. Paul was born with cardiac problems and before the child's open-heart surgery in 2008, President George W. Bush invited Baier and his wife and son to the Oval Office for a visit and had the White House physician update him on Paul's progress. In 2009, Baier was named a "Significant Sig" by the Sigma Chi Fraternity.

Works
 Special Heart: A Journey of Faith, Hope, Courage and Love (2014) 
 Three Days in January: Dwight Eisenhower's Final Mission (2017) 
 Three Days in Moscow: Ronald Reagan and the Fall of the Soviet Empire (2018) 
 Three Days at the Brink: FDR’s Daring Gamble to Win World War II (2019) 
 To Rescue the Republic: Ulysses S. Grant, the Fragile Union, and the Crisis of 1876 (2021)

References

External links

 FOX News Channel: Bret Baier bio
 
 

1970 births
Living people
DePauw University alumni
Fox News people
Marist School (Georgia) alumni
People from Dunwoody, Georgia
People from Rumson, New Jersey
Catholics from New Jersey
Catholics from Georgia (U.S. state)
21st-century American journalists
American people of German descent
American people of Irish descent